Tegan McCarthy (born 1997) is a Papua New Guinean swimmer. She competed in the 4 × 100 m, 4 × 200 m freestyle relays, and the 4 × 100 medley relay at the 2011 Pacific Games, capturing bronze in all three events, and in the 50 m, 100 m and 200 m breaststroke, 50 m (where she holds the national record with a time of 32.27 seconds) and 100 m backstroke (with a Papua New Guinea record of 1:12.61), 50 m butterfly (an event where she broke the national record ) and 100 m individual medley events at the 2012 FINA World Swimming Championships (25 m). McCarthy also competed in the 50 m breaststroke and 50 m butterfly events at the 2013 World Aquatics Championships.

References

Living people
1997 births
Papua New Guinean female swimmers